Lleulleu River is a river in the Bío Bío Region of Chile.

Rivers of Chile
Rivers of Biobío Region
Mapuche language